Gore (in order sources Gora) is a settlement in the hills east of Idrija in the traditional Inner Carniola region of Slovenia.

Church

The parish church in the settlement is dedicated to Mary Magdalene and belongs to the Koper Diocese.

References

External links

Gore on Geopedia

Populated places in the Municipality of Idrija